Sally Davison (born 1 December 1950) is a British former swimmer. Davison competed in two events at the 1968 Summer Olympics. She won the 1968 British Championship in the 400 metres freestyle  and won the 1968 800 metres freestyle title.

References

1950 births
Living people
British female swimmers
Olympic swimmers of Great Britain
Swimmers at the 1968 Summer Olympics
Sportspeople from London
20th-century British women